Andres Järving (born 3 July 1960) is an Estonian entrepreneur. Järving is one of the managers and shareholders at NG Investeeringud, which is one of the biggest Estonian private capital based investment and holding companies in Estonia. NG Investeeringud group employs more than 4300 people and operates in trade, industry and real estate.

Education
1983 Tartu State University, Economic Cybernetics
2005 University of Tartu, Psychology, BA
2002 University of Tartu, Business Management master's course

Academic membership
Fraternitas Estica (coetus)

Professional experience

1983-1988 Tallinn city soviet council committee, economist and department deputy manager
1988-1990 manufacturing community Norma, deputy head accountant
1992-1996 AS Norma, financial manager
1996-1999 AS Norma, vice chairman of the board
Since 1994 OÜ NG Investeeringud, vice chairman of the board
Since 1999 AS Selver, chairman of the board
Since 2002 OÜ NG Kapital, member of the board
Since 2000 OÜ Probus, member of the board

Entrepreneurship
OÜ NG Investeeringud, vice chairman of the board
AS Selver, chairman of the board
Kulinaaria OÜ, chairman of the board
AS Liviko, member of the board
AS Balbiino, member of the board
Kitman Thulema AS, member of the board
AS Tallinna Kaubamaja Group, member of the board
AS Tallinna Kaubamaja, member of the board
AS TKM King, member of the board (TKM King was created as a result of merging Suurtüki NK OÜ and AS ABC King)
ABC King AS, member of the board
AS TKM Auto, member of the board
AS KIA Auto, member of the board
AS Viking Motors, member of the board
UAB KIA Auto, member of the board
SIA Forum Auto, member of the board
AS Tallinna Kaubamaja Kinnisvara, member of the board
OÜ Tartu Kaubamaja Kinnisvara, member of the board
AS Viking Security, member of the board
OÜ TKM Beauty, member of the board
OÜ Roseni Kinnisvara, member of the board
OÜ Roseni Majad, member of the board
AS Wellman Invesco, member of the board
2001-2007 Ganiger Invest OÜ, member of the board
2000-2007 Baltic Rail Services, OÜ member of the board

Membership in business organisations and associations
Since 2015 Estonian Chamber of Commerce and Industry, member of the board
Since 2008 Estonian Traders Association, member of the board
Member of the Oversight Board of Ministry of Finance

Participation in non-profit and social organisations
Long-term member of Enterprise Estonia's mentor programme
Member of Fraternitas Estica alumni council

Interests
History
Nature
Forestry

References

External links
 NG Investeeringud

Estonian businesspeople
Living people
1960 births